Azhagarmalai Kalvan is a 1959 Indian Tamil language film produced and directed by Kemparaj. The film stars K. Balaji and Malini

Cast 
The list is compiled from Film News Anandan's database.
K. Balaji
Malini
V. Nagayya
C. R. Vijayakumari
Kamaraj
Manorama
V. Gopalakrishnan
Lakshmiprabha
Kaka Radhakrishnan

Soundtrack 
Music was composed by B. Gopalam, while the lyrics were penned by Puratchidasan and Vaali. The song "Nilavum Tharaiyum Neeyamma" is the first lyric penned by Vaali for a film.

References

External links 
 

1950s Tamil-language films
1959 drama films
1959 films
Indian black-and-white films
Indian drama films